The following is a list of directors of the United States Fish and Wildlife Service:

References

United States Fish and Wildlife Service
United States Fish and Wildlife Service personnel
Fish and Wildlife Service